Smart inorganic polymers (SIPs) are hybrid or fully inorganic polymers with tunable (smart) properties such as stimuli responsive physical properties (shape, conductivity, rheology, bioactivity, self-repair, sensing etc.). While organic polymers are often petrol-based, the backbones of SIPs are made from elements other than carbon which can lessen the burden on scarce non-renewable resources and provide more sustainable alternatives.  Common backbones utilized in SIPs include polysiloxanes, polyphosphates, and polyphosphazenes, to name a few.

SIPs have the potential for broad applicability in diverse fields spanning from drug delivery and tissue regeneration to coatings and electronics. As compared to organic polymers, inorganic polymers in general possess improved performance and environmental compatibility (no need for plasticizers, intrinsically flame-retardant properties).  The unique properties of different SIPs can additionally make them useful in a diverse range of technologically novel applications, such as solid polymer electrolytes for consumer electronics, molecular electronics with non-metal elements to replace metal-based conductors, electrochromic materials, self-healing coatings, biosensors, and self-assembling materials.

Role of COST action CM1302 
COST action 1302 is a European Community "Cooperation in Science and Technology" research network initiative that supported 62 scientific projects in the area of smart inorganic polymers resulting in 70 publications between 2014 and 2018, with the mission of establishing a framework with which to rationally design new smart inorganic polymers.  This represents a large share of the total body of work on SIPs. The results of this work are reviewed in the 2019 book, Smart Inorganic Polymers: Synthesis, Properties, and Emerging Applications in Materials and Life Sciences.

Smart polysiloxanes 

Polysiloxane, commonly known as silicone, is the most commonly commercially available inorganic polymer.  The large body of existing work on polysiloxane has made it a readily available platform for functionalization to create smart polymers, with a variety of approaches reported which generally center around the addition of metal oxides to a commercially available polysiloxane or the inclusion of functional side-chains on the polysiloxane backbone.   The applications of smart polysiloxanes vary greatly, ranging from drug delivery, to smart coatings, to electrochromics.

Drug delivery 
Synthesis of smart stimuli responsive polysiloxanes through the addition of a polysiloxane amine to an α,β-unsaturated carbonyl via aza-Michael addition to create a polysiloxane with N-isopropyl amide side-chains has been reported. This polysiloxane was shown to be able to load ibuprofen (a hydrophobic NSAID) and then release it in response to changes in temperature, showing it to be a promising candidate for smart drug delivery of hydrophobic drugs.  This action was attributed to the polymer's ability to retain the ibuprofen above the lower critical solution temperature (LCST), and  conversely, to dissolve below the LCST, thus releasing the loaded ibuprofen at a given, known temperature.

Coatings 
Commercial polysiloxane coatings are readily commercially available and capable of protecting surfaces from damaging pollutants, but the addition of TiO2 gives them the smart ability to degrade pollutants stuck to their surface in the presence of sunlight.  This particular phenomena is promising in the field of monument preservation.  Similar hybrid textile coatings made of amino-functionalized polysiloxane with TiO2 and silver nanoparticles have been reported to have smart stain-repellent yet hydrophilic properties, making them unique in comparison to typical hydrophobic stain-repellant coatings.  Smart properties have also been reported for polysiloxane coatings without metal oxides, namely, a polysiloxane/polyethylenimine coating designed to protect magnesium from corrosion that was found to be capable of self-healing small scratches.

Poly-(ε-caprolactone)/siloxane 
Poly-(ε-caprolactone)/siloxane is an inorganic-organic hybrid material which, when used as a solid electrolyte matrix with a lithium perchlorate electrolyte, paired to a  W2O3 film, responds to a change in electrical potential by changing transparency.  This makes it a potentially useful electrochromic smart glass.

Smart phosphorus polymers 
There exist a sizable number of phosphorus polymers with backbones ranging from primarily phosphorus to primarily organic with phosphorus subunits.  Some of these have been shown to possess smart properties, and are largely of-interest due to the biocompatibility of phosphorus for biological applications like drug delivery, tissue engineering, and tissue repair.

Polyphosphates 
Polyphosphate (PolyP) is an inorganic polymer made from phosphate subunits.  It typically exists in its deprotonated form, and can form salts with physiological metal cations like Ca2+, Sr2+, and Mg2+.  When salted to these metals, it can selectively induce bone regeneration (Ca-PolyP), bone hardening (Sr-PolyP), or cartilage regeneration (Mg-PolyP) depending on the metal to which it is salted.  This smart ability to attenuate the kind of tissue regenerated in response to different metal cations makes it a promising polymer for biomedical applications.

Polyphosphazenes 

Polyphosphazene is an inorganic polymer with a backbone consisting of phosphorus and nitrogen, which can also form inorganic-organic hybrid polymers with the addition of organic substituents.  Some polyphosphazenes have been designed through the addition of amino acid ester side chains such that their LCST is near body temperature and thus they can form a gel in situ upon injection into a person, making them potentially useful for drug delivery.  They biodegrade into a near-neutral pH mixture of phosphates and ammonia that has been shown to be non-toxic, and the rate of their biodegradation can be tuned with the addition of different substituents from full decomposition within days with glyceryl derivatives, to biostable with fluoroalkoxy substituents.

Poly-ProDOT-Me2 
Poly-ProDOT-Me2 is a phosphorus-based inorganic-organic hybrid polymer, which, when paired to a V2O5 film, provides a material that changes color upon application of an electrical current.  This 'smart glass' is capable of reducing light transmission from 57% to 28% in under 1 second, a much faster transformation than that of commercially available photochromic lenses.

Smart metalloid and metal containing polymers 
While metals are not typically associated with polymeric structures, the inclusion of metal atoms either throughout the backbone of, or as pendant structures on a polymer can provide unique smart properties, especially in relation to their redox and electronic properties. These desirable properties can range from self-repair of oxidation, to sensing, to smart material self-assembly, as discussed below.

Polystannanes 

Polystannane, a unique polymer class with a tin backbone, is the only known polymer to possess a completely organometallic backbone.  It is especially unique in the way that the conductive tin backbone is surrounded by organic substituents, making it act as an atomic-scale insulated wire.  Some polystannanes such as (SnBu2)n and (SnOct2)n have shown the smart ability to align themselves with external stimuli, which could see them become useful for pico electronics.  However, polystannane is very unstable to light, so any such advancement would require a method for stabilizing it against light degradation.

Icosahedral boron polymers 
Icosahedral boron is a geometrically unusual allotrope of boron, which can be either added as side chains to a polymer or co-polymerized into the backbone.  Icosahedral boron side chains on polypyrrole have been shown to allow the polypyrrole to self-repair when overoxidized because the icosahedral boron acts as a doping agent, enabling overoxidation to be reversed.

Polyferrocenylsilane 
Polyferrocenylsilanes are a group of common organosilicon metallopolymer with backbones consisting of silicon and ferrocene.  Variants of polyferroceylsilanes have been found to exhibit smart self-assembly in response to oxidation and subsequent smart self-disassembly upon reduction, as well as variants which can respond to electrochemical stimulation. One such example is a thin film of a polystyrene-polyferrocenylsilane inorganic-organic hybrid copolymer that was found to be able to adsorb and release ferritin with the application of an electrical potential.

Ferrocene biosensing 
A number of ferrocene-organic inorganic-organic hybrid polymers have been reported to have smart properties that make them useful for application in biosensing.  Multiple polymers with ferrocene side-chains cross-linked with glucose oxidase have shown oxidation activity which results in electrical potential in the presence of glucose, making them useful as glucose biosensors.  This sort of activity is not limited to glucose, as other enzymes can be crosslinked to allow for sensing of their corresponding molecules, like a poly(vinylferrocene)/carboxylated multiwall carbon nanotube/gelatin composite that was bound to uricase, giving it the ability to act as a biosensor for uric acid.

See also 
 Coatings
 Coordination Polymers
 Drug Delivery
 Electrochromism
 Inorganic Polymers
 Smart Materials

References 

Inorganic polymers